I Love This Life may refer to:

"I Love This Life" (Kim Cesarion song)
I Love This Life (EP), by LoCash
"I Love This Life" (LoCash song), its title track
Song by The Blue Nile